Sasithorn Hongprasert (born June 13, 1984 in Bangkok) is a Thai sport shooter. She won a gold medal for the rifle three positions at the 2007 Southeast Asian Games, coincidentally in her home city Bangkok, with a score of 669.5 points.

Hongprasert represented Thailand at the 2008 Summer Olympics in Beijing, where she competed in two rifle shooting events, along with her teammate Thanyalak Chotphibunsin. She placed thirty-sixth out of forty-seven shooters in the women's 10 m air rifle, with a total score of 390 points. Nearly a week later, Hongprasert competed for her second event, 50 m rifle 3 positions, where she was able to shoot 191 targets in a prone position, 185 in standing, and 190 in kneeling, for a total score of 565 points, finishing only in forty-first place.

References

External links
 
 
 

Sasithorn Hongprasert
Living people
Sasithorn Hongprasert
Shooters at the 2008 Summer Olympics
Sasithorn Hongprasert
1984 births
Shooters at the 2002 Asian Games
Sasithorn Hongprasert
Sasithorn Hongprasert
Southeast Asian Games medalists in shooting
Competitors at the 2007 Southeast Asian Games
Sasithorn Hongprasert
Sasithorn Hongprasert